Karivellur is a census town and Gram Panchayat in Kannur district of Kerala state, India.

Location
Karivellur is located  47 km towards north from District headquarters Kannur, 10 km from taluk HQ Payyanur and 535 km from the state capital Thiruvananthapuram.

Demographics
As of 2011 India census, Karivellur census town had population of 13,498 which constitutes 6,252 males and 7,246 females. Karivellur town spreads over an area of 11.33 km2 with 3,463 families residing in it. The male female sex ratio was 1000:1159.  Population in the age group 0-6 was 1,194 (8.8%) where 575 are males and 619 are females. Karivellur had overall literacy of 95.5% where male literacy stands at 98% and female literacy was 93.4%.
Karivellur-Peralam Grama Panchayat consists of Karivellur census town and Peralam village.

Religion
As of 2011 Indian census, Karivellur census town had total population of 13,498, of which Hindus constitute 92.4%, 6.7% Muslims and 0.9% others.

Transportation
NH 66 passes through Karivellur town. Goa and Mumbai can be accessed on the northern side and Cochin and Thiruvananthapuram can be accessed on the southern side. The road to the east of Iritty connects to Mysore and Bangalore.  The nearest railway station is Payyanur on Shoranur-Mangalore section under Southern Railway.
The nearest airport is Kannur, about 65 km away.

See also
Thekke Manakkattu

References

Villages near Payyanur
Cities and towns in Kannur district